Roby Rausch (25 September 1937 – 16 December 2008) was a Luxembourgian boxer. He competed in the men's flyweight event at the 1960 Summer Olympics.

References

1937 births
2008 deaths
Luxembourgian male boxers
Olympic boxers of Luxembourg
Boxers at the 1960 Summer Olympics
Sportspeople from Luxembourg (Belgium)
Flyweight boxers